The Ohio State Varsity "O" Hall of Fame is the athletic hall of fame for The Ohio State University. Its purpose is to recognize individuals who have contributed to the honor and fame of the university in the field of athletics.

An athlete must have earned at least one Varsity "O" letter to be eligible. An athlete is considered for recognition a minimum of five years after the graduation of his or her class. A coach or member of the athletic department must have served the Ohio State University for at least 15 years to be considered.

Charter members
The first 23 members of the Varsity "O" Hall of Fame were inducted in September, 1977. These are the names of those charter inductees:

Howard "Hopalong" Cassady — football, baseball
Paul Ebert — basketball, baseball
Wes Fesler — football, basketball, baseball, football coach
Ernie Godfrey — football, basketball, football coach
Chic Harley — football, basketball, baseball, track & field
John Havlicek — basketball, baseball
Les Horvath — football
Jimmy Hull — basketball
Vic Janowicz — football
Ford Konno — swimming
Jerry Lucas — basketball
Johnny Miner — basketball
Jack Nicklaus — golf
Jesse Owens — track & field 
Jim Parker — football
Al Patnik — diving
Mike Peppe — swimming/diving coach
George Simpson — track & field
Bill Smith — swimming
Larry Snyder — track
Lynn St. John — athletic director
John Wilce — football coach
Bill Willis — football, track & field

Notable members
Notable members include:

Men

Women

Coaches

Administration

Notes

References

External links
Official website
Full list of inductees

Ohio State University
Varsity
Halls of fame in Ohio
College sports halls of fame in the United States